Polygonum deciduum is a species of flowering plant in the family Polygonaceae, native to Uzbekistan. It was first described in 1856.

It has also been treated as a synonym of Polygonum argyrocoleon Steud. ex Kunze.

References

deciduum
Flora of Uzbekistan
Plants described in 1856